Michael Dwyer (born 1997) is an Irish hurler who plays for Wexford Championship club Fethard St Mogue's and at inter-county level with the Wexford senior hurling team. He usually lines out as a forward.

Career

Dwyer first came to hurling prominence at juvenile and underage levels with the Fethard St Mogue's club before eventually joining the club's top adult team. He was at left corner-forward when the club were beaten by Ardmore in the 2018 All-Ireland Junior Club Championship. Dwyer first played at inter-county level with the Wexford minor team during the 2015 Leinster Minor Championship before later lining out with the under-21 team. He made his senior debut during the 2021 National Hurling League.

Career statistics

Honours

Fethard St Mogue's
Leinster Junior Club Hurling Championship: 2017
Wexford Junior Hurling Championship: 2017

References

1997 births
Living people
Wexford inter-county hurlers